Vistan-e Bala (also Romanized as Vīstān-e Bālā, Veyestān-e Bālā, Vistan-Bala, and Wistān Bāla; also known as Veyestān) is a village in Khorramdarreh Rural District, in the Central District of Khorramdarreh County, Zanjan Province, Iran. At the 2006 census, its population was 103, in 29 families.

References 

Populated places in Khorramdarreh County